Abrothallus is a genus of lichenicolous fungi. It is the only genus in the monotypic family Abrothallaceae, which itself is the sole taxon in the order Abrothallales.

Taxonomy
The genus was circumscribed by Italian botanist Giuseppe De Notaris in 1849. The classification of the genus in either family or order was uncertain until molecular phylogenetic analysis revealed the group as an independent lineage in the class Dothideomycetes. Both the family and the order were circumscribed in 2013 by Sergio Pérez-Ortega and Ave Suija.

In 2012 Mikhail Zhurbenko proposed the genus Epinephroma to contain E. kamchatica; later analysis showed it to be the anamorph of an Abrothallus species, and now Epinephroma is placed in synonymy with Abrothallus. Other synonyms are Abrothallomyces, Phymatopsis, and Pseudo-lecidea.

Description
There are several morphological characteristics help define the genus Abrothallus. These include: spherical (or nearly so) ascomata without a margin or well-defined edge that are sometimes dusted with golden or green pruina; bitunicate asci (i.e., with two functional ascal wall layers) that have four to eight ascospores; brown, 2- to 4-celled, warted asymmetric ascospores; paraphyses that are ramified-anastomosed; and the presence of an epihymenium (the uppermost layer of the hymenium) with granulose pigments that often dissolve in potassium hydroxide.

Species

Abrothallus acetabuli  – parasitic on Parmelia acetabulum; from Europe
Abrothallus boomii 
Abrothallus brattii 
Abrothallus bryoriarum 
Abrothallus caerulescens 
Abrothallus canariensis 
Abrothallus cetrariae 
Abrothallus cladoniae 
Abrothallus curreyi  – New Zealand
Abrothallus doliiformis 
Abrothallus eriodermae 
Abrothallus ertzii 
Abrothallus etayoi 
Abrothallus granulatae  – parasitic on Pseudocyphellaria granulata; from Argentina
Abrothallus halei  – parasitic on Lobaria quercizans and L. pulmonaria; from Europe and North America
Abrothallus heterodermiicola 
Abrothallus hypotrachynae 
Abrothallus kamchatica 
Abrothallus lobariae 
Abrothallus macrosporus  – South America
Abrothallus microspermus 
Abrothallus nephromatis 
Abrothallus niger  – Ecuador
Abrothallus parmeliarum 
Abrothallus parmotrematis 
Abrothallus peyritschii 
Abrothallus pezizicola 
Abrothallus prodiens 
Abrothallus prodiens 
Abrothallus prodiens 
Abrothallus psoromatis 
Abrothallus puntilloi 
Abrothallus ramalinae  – Seychelles
Abrothallus santessonii 
Abrothallus secedens  – commensalistic on species of Pseudocyphellaria; from Argentina and Kenya
Abrothallus stereocaulorum 
Abrothallus stictarum  – Colombia
Abrothallus stroblii 
Abrothallus subhalei 
Abrothallus suecicus 
Abrothallus teloschistis 
Abrothallus tulasnei  – parasitic on Xanthoparmelia somloensis; from Canada
Abrothallus usneae 
Abrothallus welwitschii

References

Dothideomycetes genera
Lichenicolous fungi
Taxa named by Giuseppe De Notaris
Taxa described in 1845